Appankoil is a small hamlet on the northern side of the river Tamirabarani, after Tentirupperai in Tamil Nadu, India.  Karimaharaja had ruled the place.

References

Villages in Tirunelveli district